Petrorhagia prolifera is a species of flowering plant belonging to the family Caryophyllaceae.

Its native range is Europe to Iran, Northwestern Africa.

References

Caryophyllaceae